Nebria kincaidi is a species of ground beetle in the family Carabidae. It is found in North America.

Subspecies
These two subspecies belong to the species Nebria kincaidi:
 Nebria kincaidi balli Kavanaugh, 1979
 Nebria kincaidi kincaidi Schwarz, 1900

References

Further reading

 

kincaidi
Articles created by Qbugbot
Beetles described in 1900